José Alberto Batista González (born 6 March 1962) is an Uruguayan retired footballer who played as a defender, and a manager.

He is best known for having received a red card after 56 seconds – a World Cup record – in the 1986 game against Scotland.

Club career
Born in Colonia del Sacramento, Batista played for a number of clubs in Uruguay and Argentina, starting his career with C.A. Cerro and joining giants Club Atlético Peñarol in 1983. In 1985, he joined Deportivo Español in the latter nation, where he would spend the next decade.

Batista made a brief return to his country's top division in 1995, with Rampla Juniors. He spent his final three years with Gimnasia y Esgrima de Jujuy, Deportivo Español and Argentino de Quilmes, the latter in the Argentine second level.

International career
Batista made a total of 14 appearances for the Uruguay national team, between 1984 and 1993. His debut came on 19 September in a friendly match with Peru, in Montevideo.

During the 1986 FIFA World Cup qualifiers Batista scored a crucial goal in a 2–1 home triumph over Chile, his only for the country; in the final stages' third game, on 13 June 1986, he was sent off after less than one minute of play for a reckless challenge on Scotland's Gordon Strachan, as Uruguay eventually bowed out in the round-of-16.

References

External links
National team data 

1962 births
Living people
Uruguayan footballers
Association football defenders
Uruguayan Primera División players
C.A. Cerro players
Peñarol players
Rampla Juniors players
Argentine Primera División players
Deportivo Español footballers
Gimnasia y Esgrima de Jujuy footballers
Uruguay under-20 international footballers
Uruguay international footballers
1986 FIFA World Cup players
Uruguayan expatriate footballers
Expatriate footballers in Argentina
Uruguayan expatriate sportspeople in Argentina
Uruguayan football managers
Deportivo Español managers
Pan American Games gold medalists for Uruguay
Medalists at the 1983 Pan American Games
Footballers at the 1983 Pan American Games
Pan American Games medalists in football